

The Minister of Broadcasting and Media is a minister in the government of New Zealand with responsibility for the government's broadcasting and media policies, including the diversity and accessibility of broadcast content, broadcasting standards, the regulation of the print media, and the oversight of state media corporations TVNZ and Radio New Zealand. The current Minister is Willie Jackson, a member of the Labour Party.

History
In 1936 the First Labour Government decided that broadcasting would be run by the state. As a result a government minister in charge of Broadcasting was appointed and new legislation (the Broadcasting Act 1936) was passed that abolished the existing New Zealand Broadcasting Board and established the new National Broadcasting Service in its place. A Director of Broadcasting was appointed and a Broadcasting Advisory Council formed as a result of the act to advise the minister. The Labour Party had specifically sought to broadcast parliamentary debates via radio as a means of allowing the public to listen and make their own judgment of events, rather than relying solely on the press, whom Labour were distrustful of.

Later the minister oversaw the introduction of television into New Zealand and became responsible for the New Zealand Broadcasting Corporation (NZBC).

Between December 2016 and October 2017, the broadcasting portfolio was disestablished, with portfolio responsibilities shared between the Minister for Communications and Minister for Arts, Culture and Heritage. The position was recreated from October 2017 with a title change reflecting a broader scope. The Minister is advised by officials from the Ministry for Culture and Heritage and the Ministry of Business, Innovation and Employment.

Under the Sixth Labour Government, the focus of the portfolio was on creating a new Aotearoa New Zealand Public Media entity which would have been formed by merging TVNZ and Radio New Zealand into a single state broadcaster. The plan was later scrapped.

List of ministers
The following ministers have held the office of Minister of Broadcasting.

Key

See also
 Television in New Zealand
 Radio in New Zealand

References

Notes

Broadcasting
Broadcasting in New Zealand